US residency may refer to:
Residency (medicine) in the United States
Permanent residence (United States)